John Whitefield Hulbert (June 1, 1770 – October 19, 1831) was a U.S. Representative from Massachusetts.

Born in Alford in the Province of Massachusetts Bay, Hulbert completed preparatory studies.
He graduated from Harvard University in 1795.
He studied law.
He was admitted to the bar and commenced practice in Alford, Massachusetts, in 1797.
He served as director of Berkshire Bank, Pittsfield, Massachusetts.

Hulbert was elected as a Federalist to the Thirteenth Congress to fill the vacancy caused by the resignation of Daniel Dewey.
He was reelected to the Fourteenth Congress and served from September 26, 1814, to March 3, 1817.
He was not a candidate for renomination in 1816.
He moved to Auburn, New York, in 1817.
He represented Cayuga County as Member of the New York State Assembly in 1825. 
He resumed the practice of his profession.
He died in Auburn, New York, October 19, 1831.
He was interred in North Street Cemetery.

References

Notes

1770 births
1831 deaths
People from Berkshire County, Massachusetts
New York (state) Federalists
Members of the New York State Assembly
Harvard University alumni
Federalist Party members of the United States House of Representatives from Massachusetts